The Women's sprint at the 2013 UCI Track Cycling World Championships was held on February 22–23. 21 cyclists participated in the contest.

Medalists

Results

Qualifying
The qualifying was held at 13:00.

Finals

1/16 Finals
The 1/16 Finals were held at 13:50.

1/8 Finals 
The 1/8 Finals were held at 15:15.

Repechage

The 1/8 Finals repechages were held at 16:15.

Quarterfinals
The Quarterfinals were held at 19:00.

Race for 5th-8th Places
The race for 5th-8th places was held at 21:30.

Semifinals
The Semifinals were held at 15:40.

Finals
The Finals were held at 19:15.

Small Final

Final

References

2013 UCI Track Cycling World Championships
UCI Track Cycling World Championships – Women's sprint
UCI